Ludington House may refer to:
Val Verde (Santa Barbara, California), also known as the "Wright Ludington House", a historic estate in Montecito, California, U.S.
Ludington House (Lawrence, Kansas), a National Register of Historic Places listing in Douglas County, Kansas, U.S.
Ludington House, a historic building in Ottawa, Kansas, U.S.
House of Ludington, a house in the Escanaba Central Historic District in Escanaba, Michigan, U.S.
Ludington House, an 1878 house built by Antoine Ephrem Cartier in Ludington, Michigan, U.S.